Events in the year 1873 in Iceland.

Incumbents 

 Monarch: Christian IX
 Council President of Denmark: Ludvig Holstein-Holsteinborg

Events 

 Skautafélag Reykjavíkur is founded.
 The first Icelandic postage stamps were published in Iceland.

Births 

 6 June − Guðmundur Finnbogason, philosopher

References 

 
1870s in Iceland
Years of the 19th century in Iceland
Iceland
Iceland